Boechera gunnisoniana, or Gunnison's rockcress, is a perennial herb of the family Brassicaceae (the mustards). It grows on windswept ridges as well as on stoney hillsides in west-central Colorado. The plant has many slender, erect stems which may reach a height of 15 cm. Flowering time is from May to June.

According to chromosome counts, this species is diploid (n=7 as in all Boechera species) which probably reproduces sexually.

References

External links
USDA Plants Profile:

gunnisoniana
Flora of Colorado
Flora of North America